Goodwin Field is a 3,500-seat baseball park in the western United States, located in Fullerton, California. On the campus of California State University, Fullerton, it is primarily the home field of the four-time national champion CSUF Titans of the NCAA's Big West Conference. It is named for Jerry and Merilyn Goodwin, who gave $1 million toward a $3 million campaign for major renovations.

In 2013, the Titans ranked 29th among Division I baseball programs in attendance, averaging 2,356 per home game.

Former tenants
Goodwin Field is the former home field of the Fullerton/Orange County Flyers minor league baseball team from 2005 to 2010.

Gallery

See also
 List of NCAA Division I baseball venues

References

Baseball venues in California
Cal State Fullerton Titans baseball
College baseball venues in the United States
Defunct minor league baseball venues
Sports venues in Fullerton, California
Sports venues completed in 1992
1992 establishments in California